PacWest Bancorp is a bank holding company based in Beverly Hills, California, with one wholly owned banking subsidiary, Pacific Western Bank. Pacific Western Bank has 69 full-service branches throughout California, one in Denver, Colorado, one in Durham, North Carolina, and several loan production offices across the country. Pacific Western provides commercial banking services, including real estate, construction, and commercial loans, and deposit and treasury management services to small and medium-sized businesses.

Pacific Western offers additional products and services under the brands of its business groups, CapitalSource and Square 1 Bank, now known as National Lending and Venture Banking groups, respectively. National Lending Group provides cash flow, asset-based, equipment and real estate loans and treasury management services to established middle-market businesses on a national basis. Venture Banking Group focuses on entrepreneurial businesses and their venture capital and private equity investors.

As of 2019, Pacific Western had $26 billion in assets and 69 locations in California, primarily in the southern and central parts of the state. Pacific Western has primarily built by the acquisition of other banks. PacWest Bancorp was named the best bank in United States for 2017 by Forbes.

History
PacWest Bancorp was formerly known as First Community Bancorp. In 2005, First Community Bancorp acquired Glendora, California-based Foothill Independent Bancorp for $238 million. In 2006, First Community Bancorp combined the two banks it then owned, Pacific Western National Bank and First National Bank, renaming them the Pacific Western Bank. In 2008, First Community Bancorp announced its plans to reincorporate in Delaware and change its name to PacWest Bancorp.

Pacific Western Bank acquired the deposits and other assets of other banking institutions which failed during the financial crisis. In 2008, Pacific Western assumed the deposits and other assets of Security Pacific Bank of Los Angeles, CA. In 2009, Pacific Western assumed the deposits and other assets of Affinity Bank, Ventura, CA.  In 2010, Pacific Western assumed the deposits and other assets of Los Padres Bank, Solvang, CA.

In July 2013, PacWest announced it would acquire the commercial bank CapitalSource for around $2.29 billion.

On March 2, 2015, an $894 million merger was announced with Square 1 Financial Inc., the parent company of Durham, North Carolina-based Square 1 Bank.  The bank started in 2005 grew to 13 locations and $3.1 billion in assets. The merger would result in Pacific Western becoming California's sixth largest publicly traded bank.

On January 17, 2019, PacWest Bancorp decided to retire CapitalSource and Square 1 Bank brand names and renamed them with National Lending and Venture Banking groups. The bank recognized a $2.1 million write-off as retiring the Square 1 brand name.

On February 17, 2022, PacWest Bancorp filed an 8-K with the SEC stating it would be laying off 200 employees from its wholly owned subsidiary, Civic Financial Services. The layoffs come after an abysmal fourth-quarter 2022 earnings, with delinquent loans seeing a sequential increase of 266%, mainly due to an increase in Civic delinquent loans. In addition, PacWest Bancorp recorded a $29 million impairment charge due to Civic. As of December 31, 2022, PacWest Bancorp holds over $3 billion worth of Civic sub-prime loans on its balance sheet.  

Shares of the company dropped 37% in value on March 10, 2023 in response to the collapse of Silicon Valley Bank. On March 13, share trading was halted after a fall of 52% on the day.

References 

Banks based in California
Holding companies of the United States
Companies based in Beverly Hills, California
Companies listed on the Nasdaq
American companies established in 1999
Banks established in 1999
Holding companies established in 1999
1999 establishments in California